Patricia Davidson may refer to:

 Patricia Davidson (Canadian politician) (born 1946), Conservative MP from Ontario
 Patricia M. Davidson, Australian professor of nursing